Oromocto was a provincial electoral district for the Legislative Assembly of New Brunswick, Canada.

The district was created in 1973 from the old multi-member district of Sunbury, taking in the Town of Oromocto, CFB Gagetown and immediate surrounding areas. In 1994 its boundaries were considerably expanded, taking in larger parts of Sunbury County and parts of Queens County and it was renamed Oromocto-Gagetown (in recognition of the Village of Gagetown, not the Canadian Forces Base known as CFB Gagetown). In 2006, its boundaries were changed again when it lost all of its territory north of the Saint John River and was returned to the original name of Oromocto.

Members of the Legislative Assembly

Election results

Oromocto (2006–2010)

Oromocto-Gagetown

Oromocto (1974–1995)

References

External links
Website of the Legislative Assembly of New Brunswick

Former provincial electoral districts of New Brunswick